Aplota is a genus of moths in the concealer moth family Oecophoridae.

Species
The following species are recognised in the genus Aplota:
 Aplota nigricans (Zeller, 1852)
 Aplota palpella (Haworth, 1828)

References

Oecophorinae